Communion: A True Story is a book by American ufologist and horror author Whitley Strieber that was first published in February 1987. The book is based on the experiences of Whitley Strieber, who experiences "lost time" and terrifying flashbacks, which hypnosis undertaken by Budd Hopkins later links to an alleged encounter with aliens. Communion was a nonfiction best seller for six months in 1987.

The book was later made into a film directed by Philippe Mora and starring Christopher Walken as Strieber and Lindsay Crouse as his wife, Anne.  A 2008 trade paperback edition presents a new preface by the author.

Strieber compares the "familiar" being he sees, whom he describes as female, to the Sumerian goddess Ishtar.

Cover art
The cover painting of an alien was rendered by Ted Seth Jacobs. The painting is considered one of the most widely recognised popular culture images of alleged "grey" aliens. The Communion cover, Jacobs recounts:
"was painted in my small apartment on East 83rd St, in New York City. Whitley sat with me first for a drawing of the Alien. As I sketched, he would indicate how to change the portrait so that it would more match what he saw. It was, I believe, the process used by police sketch artists. Every last detail was corrected according to his instructions. At one point, he said the image corresponded exactly to what he had seen. With Whitley beside me for the subsequent session, I began to paint the image on a wooden prepared panel, going through the same process as for the drawing, until Whitley finally said the image was exact. ... As to the gender of the Alien image, to tell the truth, the subject didn't come up. I don't even know if the 'greys' have gender as we understand it. Whitley corrected the developing image to have a certain fragility, a vulnerability. I suppose we Earthlings usually associate these qualities with femininity".

Popular culture references
The X-Files episode "Jose Chung's From Outer Space" parodied the book cover.

Virginia screamo band Pg. 99 included an audio recording of a person reading a short excerpt of the story in their album Document #5.

Swedish progressive metal band Evergrey's album In Search of Truth is a concept album based on the novel.

Sahar is seen reading a well worn copy of this book in "Love Language" (S1, Ep5) of the SyFy series Resident Alien.

The book cover and Strieber himself make an appearance in the 2009 film Race to Witch Mountain.

Bibliography
 Communion: A True Story by Whitley Strieber, Avon Books, paperback, 1995.

References

External links
 

Books about extraterrestrial life
Books by Whitley Strieber
Alien abduction in popular culture
1987 books
Books adapted into films
Avon (publisher) books